Vladimir Joković  (Serbian Cyrillic: Владимир Јоковић; born 2 January 1967) is a Montenegrin politician, sports administrator and former karateka serving as the deputy prime minister of Montenegro and the minister of agriculture, forestry and water management since 28 April 2022.

He is the current leader of the Socialist People's Party (SNP), since August 2017, and served as the member of the Parliament of Montenegro, elected from the For the Future of Montenegro (ZBCG) common electoral list, at the 2020 parliamentary election. He also currently serve as the President of the Assembly of the Karate Federation of Montenegro, since 2019, he previously served as President of the Federation.

Biography
Vladimir Joković was born in Plužine, small town in northwestern Montenegro, at that time part of the Socialist Republic of Montenegro of Socialist Federal Republic of Yugoslavia. Having finished elementary and Electrotechnical High school  in Nikšić. He is married and has two daughter and son.

Sports career
He represented FR Yugoslavia from 1991 to 2000. He has won many awards for his sportsmanship. He is one of the most famous karate masters from Montenegro. He has a 4th Dan black belt in karate and is the winner of multiple national Serbia and Montenegro and regional Balkans Karate Championships. In May 2017 Joković became the president of the Montenegrin Karate Federation.

Political career
Joković has been a member of the Socialist People's Party of Montenegro (SNP) since the 1990s. After Socialist People's Party President Srđan Milić resignation after 11 years of leading party for a catastrophically poor results at 2016 parliamentary elections. Joković, supported by party faction led by former president of party parliamentary club Aleksandar Damjanović and current mayor of Berane Dragoslav Šćekić, was surprisingly elected President of the party at SNP's eight congress held on 13 August 2017, in front of favored Snežana Jonica, supported by fraction close to former party leader Milić. Prior to the party's congress in August 2017, Joković was a member of the SNP municipal board in Plužine, as well as one of the party's councilors in the local parliament.

On 1 May 2019 SNP sign an agreement with Independent parliamentary group of Parliament of Montenegro composed of United Montenegro (UCG), Workers' Party (RP) and two independent MPs, including former SNP high-ranking member Aleksandar Damjanović, forming new catch-all alliance named For the Benefit of All 
Alliance eventually dissolved prior the parliamentary election in August 2020, all three parties decided to join a pre-election coalition with right-wing Democratic Front (DF) alliance, under the name For the Future of Montenegro, employing a more significant cultural and socially conservative discourse, supporting 2019-2020 clerical protests in Montenegro and Serbian Orthodox Church rights in Montenegro. As the leader of SNP, Joković received the fifth position on the combined electoral list and was elected to the Parliament of Montenegro after the coalition won 32.55% of popular vote and 27 MPs (in the 81-seat parliament of Montenegro).

Since 28 April 2022, he has been serving as the minister of agriculture, forestry and water management in the minority government of Dritan Abazović.

References

1967 births
Living people
Agriculture ministers of Montenegro
Deputy Prime Ministers of Montenegro
Forestry ministers of Montenegro
Government ministers of Montenegro
Montenegrin male karateka
Serbs of Montenegro
Socialist People's Party of Montenegro politicians
Water ministers of Montenegro